On the Hot Dog Streets is the third studio album by the band Go-Kart Mozart, the musical project of former Felt and Denim frontman Lawrence. It was released in 2012 on West Midlands Records, a subsidiary of Cherry Red.

Several of the songs originally appeared on the unreleased Denim album Denim Take Over, though have been re-recorded, often with new lyrics. The album's release coincided with the nationwide launch of the acclaimed documentary Lawrence of Belgravia, which followed the album's recording and completion.

Track listing
All songs written by Lawrence.
"Lawrence Takes Over" - 3:28
"West Brom Blues" - 3:16
"The Sun" - 2:09
"Retro-Glancing" - 4:05	
"Come On You Lot" - 3:13	
"Blowin' In A Secular Breeze" - 4:34
"Mickie Made The Most" - 2:30	
"White Stilettos In The Sand" - 4:01	
"I Talk With Robot Voice" - 2:16	
"Synth Wizard" - 3:53
"Spunky Axe" - 2:35	
"Ollie Ollie Get Your Collie" - 3:03
"As Long As You Come Home Tonight" - 3:16
"Robot Rock" - 0:29
"Electrosex" - 3:26
"Queen Of The Scene" - 3:06	
"Men Look At Women" - 3:24

References 

2012 albums
Go-Kart Mozart albums